Benaam may refer to:

Benaam (1974 film), starring Amitabh Bachchan
Benaam (1999 film)
Benaam (2006 film)
Benaam (sculpture), one of two sculptures that make up We Come in Peace
Benaam (TV series), 2021 Pakistani television drama serial